The Americas Zone was the unique zone within Group 3 of the regional Davis Cup competition in 2022. The zone's competition was held in round robin format in Escazú, Costa Rica, from 22 to 25 June 2022.

Participating nations

Draw
Date: 22–25 June 2022

Location: Costa Rica Country Club, Escazú, Costa Rica (hard)

Format: Round-robin basis. Two pools of four teams and nations will play each team once in their group. The two group winners will automatically earn promotion to the World Group II play-offs in 2022.

The two second-placed teams will fight for the third remaining promotion spot. The four teams finishing in third and last place will fight to avoid relegation to Americas Group IV.

Seeding

 1Davis Cup Rankings as of 7 March 2022

Round Robin

Pool A

Pool B

Standings are determined by: 1. number of wins; 2. number of matches; 3. in two-team ties, head-to-head records; 4. in three-team ties, (a) percentage of sets won (head-to-head records if two teams remain tied), then (b) percentage of games won (head-to-head records if two teams remain tied), then (c) Davis Cup rankings.

Playoffs

 ,  and  qualify for the 2023 Davis Cup World Group II Play-offs

Round Robin

Pool A

Venezuela vs. Panama

Guatemala vs. Puerto Rico

Venezuela vs. Puerto Rico

Guatemala vs. Panama

Venezuela vs. Guatemala

Puerto Rico vs. Panama

Pool B

Paraguay vs. Bahamas

Jamaica vs. Costa Rica

Paraguay vs. Costa Rica

Jamaica vs. Bahamas

Paraguay vs. Jamaica

Costa Rica vs. Bahamas

Play-offs

Promotional play-offs

Venezuela vs. Paraguay

Jamaica vs. Panama

Relegation play-offs

Guatemala vs. Bahamas

Costa Rica vs. Puerto Rico

Final placements 

 ,  and  qualify for the 2023 Davis Cup World Group II Play-offs

References

External links
Official Website

Davis Cup Americas Zone
Americas Zone